Nataliya Viktorovna Meshchaninova (born on 17 February 1982) is a Russian film director, screenwriter, and author. As a screenwriter, she won, in 2015 together with Lyubov Mulmenko, the Nika Award for Discovery of the Year. The films she directed were screened on major international festivals, including 2018 Toronto International Film Festival and 52nd International Film Festival Rotterdam.

Meshchaninova was born in Krasnodar. She started work on documentaries first. In 2010, she worked with Valeriya Gai Germanika as a director of the TV Series School (Shkola).

She is married to the actor Stepan Devonin.

Filmography

As director
 School (Shkola, 2010), series
 Kombinat Nadezhda (2014)
 Red Bracelets (2015), series
 Heart of the World (2018)

As screenwriter
 Kombinat Nadezhda (2014)
 Heart of the World (2018)

References

1982 births
Living people
Russian women film directors
21st-century Russian screenwriters